Rabab Eid Sayed Awad (born 10 August 1990 in Cairo) is an Egyptian freestyle wrestler. She competed in the freestyle 55 kg event at the 2012 Summer Olympics and was eliminated by Tetyana Lazareva in the  finals.

References

External links
 

1990 births
Living people
Egyptian female sport wrestlers
Olympic wrestlers of Egypt
Wrestlers at the 2012 Summer Olympics
21st-century Egyptian women